Emilian Bratu (8 August 1904 – 31 March 1991) was a Romanian chemical engineer, founder of chemical engineering education in Romania. With the Austrian physical chemist Otto Redlich he studied the dissociation constant of heavy water.

Life and work
He was born in Bucharest and studied at the National School of Bridges and Roads, the future Politehnica University of Bucharest. He then attended the Technical University of Vienna specializing in physical chemistry and electrochemistry. Here he met Otto Redlich with whom he studied the properties of heavy water between 1932-1935.

Returning home he taught a course titled Processes and Devices in Chemical Industry forerunner of chemical engineering courses in Romania.

Collaboration with the professor Costin Nenitescu 
Emilian Bratu and Costin Nenițescu were two senior professors of the Faculty of Industrial Chemistry. The two scholars were good friends who have been deeply respected in the course of their life. Both of them, having German education, have early intuited the necessity of introducing in Romania the Chemical Engineering discipline for higher polytechnic education, starting from the favorable external prospects related to the development of the chemical industry based on national raw material reserves. They fought together to assert chemistry in Polytechnics, and largely thanks to their effort, in 1938 the "Industrial Chemistry" name for Polytechnics faculty was introduced. 

Thus, in 1940 - 1950, Prof. Costin Nenițescu supported the effort Prof. Emilian Bratu for establishing and consolidating of the Department of Processes and Apparatus in Bucharest, later it became the Department of Chemical Engineering, being the first such chair in the country and among the first in Europe. On the other hand, in the early fiftieth, Prof. Emilian Bratu accepted  the request of Prof. Costin Nenițescu to give a lecture on the progress of chemical engineering, especially in the field of application of chemical similarity in the chemical reactions. The lecture was given to the teaching staff and research collaborators in the field of Organic Chemistry. On the whole, the lecture was a rousing interest.

Notes

External links
 
 Chemical Engineering Department
 Romanian Academy
 Centenary
 
TU Wien

1904 births
1991 deaths
Engineers from Bucharest
Politehnica University of Bucharest alumni
Romanian chemical engineers
Titular members of the Romanian Academy